These are the official results of the Men's 400 metres event at the 1990 European Championships in Split, Yugoslavia, held at Stadion Poljud on 28, 29, and 30 August 1990.

Medalists

Results

Final
30 August

Semi-finals
29 August

Semi-final 1

Semi-final 2

Heats
28 August

Heat 1

Heat 2

Heat 3

Participation
According to an unofficial count, 22 athletes from 11 countries participated in the event.

 (2)
 (1)
 (1)
 (1)
 (2)
 (1)
 (3)
 (3)
 (3)
 (2)
 (3)

See also
 1988 Men's Olympic 400 metres (Seoul)
 1991 Men's World Championships 400 metres (Tokyo)
 1992 Men's Olympic 400 metres (Barcelona)

References

 Results

400
400 metres at the European Athletics Championships